Nancy is a common English language given name for women. The name Nancy was originally a diminutive form of Anne or Ann. It began to be used as a proper name from the 18th century onwards. Similar names include Nan, Nance, Nanette, and Nannie.

Nancy may refer to:

People
 Nancy Ajram (born 1983), Lebanese singer
 Nancy Alexiadi, Greek singer
 Nancy Allen (actress) (born 1950), American actress
 Nancy Allen (harpist) (born 1954), American harpist
 Nancy Astor, Viscountess Astor (1879–1954), first woman to sit in British Parliament
 Nancy Balfour (1911–1997), English arts administrator and journalist
 Nancy Lee Bass (1917–2013), American philanthropist
 Nancy Benoit (1964–2007), American professional wrestling manager
 Nancy Beiman, Canadian animator and professor
 Nancy Binay (born 1973), Filipina politician
 Nancy Boyd-Franklin (born 1950), American psychologist and writer
 Nancy Carell (born 1966), American comedian and actress
 Nancy Carrillo (born 1986), Cuban volleyball player
 Nancy Carroll (1903–1965), American actress
 Nancy Cartwright (born 1957), American actress
 Nancy Dell'Olio (born 1961), Italian lawyer
 Nancy Doe (born 1949), First Lady of Liberia
 Nancy Dussault (born 1936), American actress
 Nancy Edberg (1832–1892), Swedish swimmer
 Nancy Walker Bush Ellis (1926–2021), American environmentalist
 Nancy Everhard (born 1957), American actress
 Nancy Faeser (born 1970), German politician
 Nancy Fish (1850–1927), English socialite
 Nancy Garrido, wife of sex offender and kidnapper Phillip Garrido
 Nancy Goldsmith (born 1966), Israeli Olympic gymnast
 Nancy Gordon, American economist and statistician
 Nancy Grace (born 1959), American prosecutor & TV personality
 Nancy Greene (born 1943), Canadian alpine skier
 Nancy Guillén (born 1976), Salvadoran hammer thrower
 Nancy Haigwood, American scientist
 Nancy Hayfield, American author, editor, and publisher
 Nancy Hower (born 1966), American actress, director, screenwriter and producer
 Nancy Hubbard (born 1963), American author and professor of business and management
 Nancy Jewel McDonie (born 2000), singer in K-Pop band Momoland, performs under the name Nancy
 Nancy Jobson (1880–1964), Australian teacher and headmistress
 Nancy Kerrigan (born 1969), American figure skater
 Nan Kinross (1926–2021), New Zealand nurse and nursing academic
 Nancy Kwan (born 1939), Hong Kong American actress
 Nancy Ledins (1932–2017), American Catholic priest and transgender woman
 Nancy Leveson, American expert in system and software safety
 Nancy Lieberman (born 1958), American WNBA Hall of Fame basketball player, general manager, and coach, Olympic silver medal
 Nancy Lincoln (1784–1818), mother of Abraham Lincoln
 Nancy Lublin (born 1971), American businesswoman
 Nancy Luce (1814–1890), American folk artist and poet
 Nancy Ludington (born 1939), American pair skater
 Nancy Lusk, American politician
 Nancy Lynn (1956–2006), American entrepreneur, pilot, and public speaker
 Nancy Mace (born 1977), American politician
 Nancy Mann, American statistician
 Nancy Marchand (1928–2000), American actress
 Nancy Marcus (1950-2018), American biologist and college administrator
 Nancy Mowll Mathews (born 1947), Czech-American art historian, curator, and author
 Nancy McArthur, American children's author
 Nancy McCredie (1945–2021), Canadian track and field athlete
 Nancy McKeon (born 1966), American actress
 Nancy McLeón (born 1971), Cuban track and field athlete
 Nancy Melcher (1916–2015), American lingerie designer
 Nancy Metcalf (born 1978), American volleyball player
 Nancy Mitford (1904–1973), English novelist and biographer
 Nancy Neudauer, American mathematician
 Nancy Oakes, American chef
 Nancy O'Dell (born 1966), American television host and entertainment journalist
 Nancy Osbaldeston (born 1989), English ballet dancer
 Nancy Pelosi (born 1940), 52nd Speaker of the United States House of Representatives
 Nancy Reagan (1921–2016), former First Lady of the United States
 Nancy Richler (1957–2018), Canadian novelist
 Nancy Roper (1918–2004), British nurse theorist and lexicographer
 Nancy Salzman (born 1954), American felon
 Nancy L. Segal (born 1951), American evolutionary psychologist and behavioral geneticist
 Nancy Sinatra (born 1940), American singer and actress
 Nancy Spungen (1958–1978), American ex-girlfriend of Sid Vicious and murder victim
 Nancy Shukri (born 1961), Malaysian politician
 Nancy Sullivan (disambiguation)
 Nancy Tate, American politician
 Nancy Travis (born 1961), American actress
 Nancy Vallecilla (born 1957), Ecuadorian athlete
 Nancy Wilson (jazz singer) (1937–2018), American jazz singer
 Nancy Wilson (rock musician) (born 1954), American musician and member of the band Heart
 Nancy Wilson (religious leader) (born 1950), current Moderator of the Universal Fellowship of Metropolitan Community Churches
 Nancy Wilson (journalist), Canadian television journalist
 Nancy Wu (born 1981), Hong Kong actress
 Nancy VanderMeer, American businesswoman and politician
 Nancy Yi Fan (born 1993), Chinese-American author
 Nancy Gaymala Yunupingu (c.1935–2005), Aboriginal Australian artist
 Nancy Zafris, American writer

Fictional characters
 Nancy, a character from Oliver Twist
 Nancy, a radio dispatcher who assigns missions on the Chase H.Q. series of video games
 Nancy Adams, a character from the 2016 film The Shallows
 Nancy Blackett, a character from Swallows and Amazons series of books by Arthur Ransome
 Nancy Botwin, the female lead on the TV series Weeds
 Nancy Callahan, a character from Sin City
 Nancy Clancy Thompson, a character from Jackie French's "Matilda Saga"
 Nancy (comic strip), created by Ernie Bushmiller
 Nancy Drew, the heroine detective of the mystery series of the same name
 Nancy Downs, a character from The Craft
 Nancy Green, a character from Big City Greens
 Nancy Gribble, a character from King of the Hill, wife of Dale Gribble
 Nancy Hayton, a regular character in Channel 4 soap opera Hollyoaks
 Nancy Kitchen, a character in animated series Budgie the Little Helicopter
 Nancy Knapp, a fictional character and chapter title in Spoon River Anthology
 Nancy Leathers, a fictional character in the ITV soap opera Coronation Street, the grandmother of Ken Barlow and the mother of Ida Barlow
 Nancy Partridge, a character from Sherlock Holmes in Washington
 Nancy Taylor, a character in the 1993 American fantasy comedy Groundhog Day
 Nancy Thompson (A Nightmare on Elm Street), the heroine from two of the A Nightmare on Elm Street films
 Nancy Tremaine, a character in the 2007 film Enchanted
 Nancy Wilmot, a schoolgirl and later mistress in Elinor Brent-Dyer's Chalet School series
 Nancy Wesley, a character on soap opera Days of Our Lives
 Nancy Wheeler, a character from Stranger Things

Notes

Given names
Feminine given names
English given names
English feminine given names